Schisandraceae is a family of flowering plants with 3 known genera and a total of 92 known species. Such a family has been recognized by most taxonomists, at least for the past several decades. Before that, the plants concerned were assigned to family Magnoliaceae and Illiciaceae.

The APG IV and APG III systems of taxonomy recognize this family and place it on the order Austrobaileyales.

The APG II system, of 2003, also recognizes such a family. It places the family in order Austrobaileyales, which in turn is accepted as being among the most basic lineages in the clade angiosperms.  APG II assumes this to be a family of three genera, the Schisandraceae sensu lato. This family consists of woody plants, containing essential oils.

However, APG II does allow the option of segregating the genus Illicium as the family Illiciaceae.  This leaves only two genera in the family Schisandraceae sensu stricto, consisting of Schisandra and Kadsura, totalling several dozen species, which are found in tropical to temperate regions of East and Southeast Asia and North America.

The APG system, of 1998, recognized both the families Schisandraceae sensu stricto and Illiciaceae, unplaced as to order. It regarded both families as being among the most basic lineages in the clade angiosperms.

The Cronquist system, of 1981, treated the plants in the family (in its wider sense) as two separate families, which together constituted 
 the order Illiciales,
 in subclass Magnoliidae,
 in class Magnoliopsida [=dicotyledons], 
 of division Magnoliophyta [=angiosperms].

Genera

Pollination
Schisandaceae are pollinated predominantly by nocturnal gall midges that lay their eggs in the male and female flowers (in Schisandraceae species with unisexual flowers) or the male-stage and female-stage flowers (in species with bisexual flowers). The larvae of these midges develop in the floral tissue once it has dropped to the ground, feeding on floral exudates (not ovules or pollen).

References

External links
 Schisandraceae [sensu stricto] in the Flora of North America
 NCBI Taxonomy Browser [Schisandraceae sensu lato]
 
 Luo, S-X., L-J. Zhang, S. Yuan, Z-H. Ma, D-X. Zhang, and S. S. Renner. 2018. The largest early-diverging angiosperm family is mostly pollinated by ovipositing insects and so are most surviving lineages of early angiosperms. Proc. Roy. Soc. B 285: 20172365; 

 
Angiosperm families